Mees Rijks (born 8 March 2003) is a Dutch footballer who plays as a striker for FC Utrecht.

Rijks made his debut in the Eerste Divisie for Jong FC Utrecht in the 2020-21 season against MVV Maastricht. Rijks scored his first goal in the Eerste Divisie against FC Eindhoven on the 12 May 2021.
Rijks signed a new professional contract with Utrecht in September 2021 extending his contract until 2023.

On 13 March 2022, Rijks made his Eredivisie debut FC Utrecht appearing as an 82nd minute substitution against PSV Eindhoven.

International career
Rijks played for Netherlands U19 in the 2022 UEFA European Under-19 Championship qualification matches.

References 

2003 births
Living people
Dutch footballers
Association football forwards
Eerste Divisie players